Hay is dried grass.

Hay or HAY may also refer to:

Places 
 Hay, New South Wales, Australia, a town
 Hay Island (Queensland), Australia
 Hay Island (Tasmania), Australia
 Hay River (Western Australia)
 Hay County, Western Australia
 Hay River (Canada), in Alberta and the Northwest Territories
 Hay Islands, Nunavut, Canada
 Cape Hay, Nunavut, Canada
 Hay, Cornwall, England, a farm
 Hay, Iran, a village in Zanjan Province
 Hay Township, Michigan, United States
 Hay, Washington, United States, an unincorporated community
 Hay River (Wisconsin), United States
 Hay Island (Connecticut), United States
 Hay Creek (disambiguation), all in the United States
 Hay Peak, South Georgia Island
 Mount Hay (disambiguation), in various countries
 -Hay (place name element), common in England
 Hay-on-Wye, in Wales on the English-Welsh border

People 
 Hay (surname)
 Háy, a Hungarian surname
 Hay (given name)
 Clan Hay, a Scottish clan
 Hay, Armenian for Armenians

Transportation 
 Hay Street, Perth, Western Australia
 Hay Street, Kalgoorlie, Western Australia
 Hay railway line, New South Wales, Australia
 Hay Railway, an early horse-drawn tramway in Wales
 HAY, FAA airport code for Haycock Airport, Alaska, United States
 HAY, IATA airport code for Hacaritama Airport, Cesar, Colombia
 HAY, National Rail station code for Hayes & Harlington railway station, England

Other uses 
 Hay Group, an international human resource consultancy
 Hay baronets, four titles in the Baronetage of Nova Scotia
 "Hay" song, released in 1996 by Crucial Conflict
 Hay Street (disambiguation)
 He (letter), a Hebrew letter that may be spelled "hay" especially in English-speaking contexts

See also 
 Hay Land District, Western Australia
 Hay Swamp, Ontario, Canada
 Haytor or Hay Tor, Devon, England, a granite tor
 Hay Hollow, Missouri, United States, a valley
 Hay Bluff, Wales
 Hay Urban District, Wales, a former urban district
 Hay Grade, a system for job evaluation and grading
 Haye, a village in Cornwall 
 Hayes (disambiguation)
 Hays (disambiguation)
 Hey (disambiguation)
 La Haye (disambiguation)